Galabovtsi is a village in Slivnitsa Municipality, Sofia Province, located in western Bulgaria approximately 7 km south of the town of Slivnitsa.

References

Villages in Sofia Province